Alexandra Priscila do Nascimento Martínez (born 16 September 1981) is a Brazilian former handball player. She played in the Brazilian national team.

Career
She was born in 1981 in Limeira (São Paulo) but she soon moved to Espírito Santo where she grew up. She moved to Austria in 2004.

In 2012, she was the first Brazilian handballer to be voted IHF World Player of the Year.

In 2016, she was chosen for the third time to be in Brazil's Olympic handball team. She was the top scorer in her first two games.

Achievements
Austrian League:
Winner: 2004, 2005, 2006, 2007, 2008, 2009, 2010, 2011, 2012, 2013, 2014
Austrian Cup:
Winner: 2004, 2005, 2006, 2007, 2008, 2009, 2010, 2011, 2012, 2013, 2014
Romanian League:
Finalist: 2015
Romanian Cup: 
Winner: 2015
EHF Champions League:
Finalist: 2008
Semifinalist: 2005, 2007, 2009
EHF Cup Winners' Cup
Winner: 2013
Runners-up: 2004
EHF Champions Trophy
Runners-up: 2008
Baia Mare Champions Trophy: 
Winner: 2014
Pan American Games:
Winner: 2003, 2007, 2011, 2015
World Championship:
Winner: 2013
Pan American Championship:
Winner: 2003, 2005, 2007, 2011, 2013
Silver Medalist: 2009
South American Championship:
Winner: 2013
Provident Cup:
Winner: 2013

Awards and recognition
 World Championship Top Scorer: 2011 
 World Championship Second Best Scorer: 2013 
 EHF Champions League Second Best Scorer: 2010 
 All-Star Right Wing of the Summer Olympics: 2012 
 IHF World Player of the Year – Women: 2012 
 Austrian Handball Federation Right Wing of the Year – Women: 2013
 Most Valuable Player Pan American Championship: 2013

Personal life
Since July 2011, she is married to Chilean international handballer, Patricio Martínez.

References

External links

 

1981 births
Living people
People from Limeira
Brazilian female handball players
Handball players at the 2004 Summer Olympics
Handball players at the 2008 Summer Olympics
Handball players at the 2012 Summer Olympics
Handball players at the 2016 Summer Olympics
Olympic handball players of Brazil
Expatriate handball players
Brazilian expatriate sportspeople in Austria
Brazilian expatriate sportspeople in Hungary
Brazilian expatriate sportspeople in Romania
Fehérvár KC players
CS Minaur Baia Mare (women's handball) players
Handball players at the 2003 Pan American Games
Handball players at the 2007 Pan American Games
Handball players at the 2011 Pan American Games
Handball players at the 2015 Pan American Games
Pan American Games medalists in handball
Pan American Games gold medalists for Brazil
Medalists at the 2007 Pan American Games
Medalists at the 2015 Pan American Games
Medalists at the 2011 Pan American Games
Handball players at the 2020 Summer Olympics
Sportspeople from São Paulo (state)
21st-century Brazilian women